Keith Jackson (1928–2018) was an American sportscaster.

Keith Jackson may also refer to:
Keith Jackson (defensive tackle) (born 1985), American football player 
Keith Jackson (tight end) (born 1965), American football player, father of the previous